Balach Marri  was the leader of the Balochistan Liberation Army (BLA), a terrorist organisation fighting to separate the Balochistan province from Pakistan. The BLA Listed as a Terrorist organization by Pakistan, UK and America, United Kingdom and the United States.

Personal life
Marri was one of six sons of Balochistan politician Khair Bakhsh Marri. Marri's brothers are Hyrbyair Marri, Ghazan Marri, Hamza Marri, Mehran Marri, and Changez Marri.

Leader of Baloch Liberation Army (BLA)
Balach Marri was one of the major leader of Baloch Liberation Army (BLA). After his death, a division was created in BLA. Since Hyrbyair Marri was arrested in United Kingdom, Mehran Marri took control of BLA. Mehran was accused of running the affairs of BLA in mismanaged manner. The rift between Mehran Marri and Hyrbyair Marri led to the creation of United Baloch Army (UBA). BLA leadership has accused Mehran and his companions of stealing $3 million funds and $800 million worth of weapons from BLA, with which they launched UBA. United Baloch Army is a break away faction of Baloch Liberation Army and is currently run by Mehran Marri.

Moreover, after Balach Marri's death BLA was greatly weakened in North-Eastern and Central part of Balochistan.

Murder of Akbar Bugti
The Chairman of the Baloch Youth Council (London), Waja Mir Hazar Khan Baloch, stated that Balach Marri was behind the murder of Akbar Bugti. He stated that Brahamdagh Bugti told him that the cave in which Akbar Bugti was hiding in, came down due to blast by remote control and Balach Marri was standing just outside the cave at that time.
 
Moreover, Baloch Youth Council (London) stated that an Indian diplomat had organised a meeting between Harbiyar Marri and Brahamdagh Bugti to resolve misunderstanding among them. The council claimed that Indian intelligence wing RAW was also present in the meeting between the two leaders. Indian intelligence officials and diplomats tried to persuade them to resolve difference among themselves. Harbiyar Marri wanted full independence and form government-in-exile. While Brahamdagh Bugti rejected Harbiyar's plan and claimed that he was the international leader.

Death
Balach Marri was killed in Afghanistan on 21 November 2007. According to some sources, Marri was killed in a North Atlantic Treaty Organization (NATO) airstrike in Afghanistan. NATO officials had mistook him and his men for Taliban fighters and conducted airstrike on them, resulting in Marri's death.

However, Abdul Qadeer Baloch also known as Mama Qadeer, said that Khair Bakhsh Marri believed that Hyrbyair Marri was behind the killing of Balach Marri. He made these remarks while reading out the last message of Khair Bakhsh Marri. In the message, Khair Bakhsh Marri questioned the circumstances  surrounding the death of Balach Marri. In the written message, Khair Bakhsh Marri claimed that Hyrbyair Marri was the one who assassinated Balach Marri.

References

External links 
 

1966 births
2007 deaths
Baloch nationalists
Baloch politicians
Pakistani politicians
Pakistani expatriates in Russia
Balach